Siege of Eger may refer to:

 Siege of Eger (1552)
 Siege of Eger (1596)